Alexander Rice Esty (also known as Alexander Rice Estey) (18 October 1826 – 2 July 1881) was an American architect known for designing many Gothic Revival churches in New England, however his work also encompassed university buildings, public buildings, office buildings, and private residences across the Northeastern United States.

Esty was born in Framingham, Massachusetts, the youngest child of Dexter Esty (1791–1860), a local builder, and Mary Eames (Rice) Esty (1787–1849).  Esty remained a resident of Framingham  for his entire life and was the brother of Massachusetts Congressman Constantine C. Esty.  Esty married (1) in 1854, Julia Maria Wight (1835–1862) daughter of Julia Maria Terry and Lothrop Wight (a wealthy Boston merchant), (2) in 1865, Charlotte Louise Blake (1840–1866), and (3) in 1867, Emma Corning Newell (1845–1886) daughter of Olive Plimpton and George Newell (a sea captain). Esty was a descendant of Edmund Rice an early immigrant to Massachusetts Bay Colony, and a direct descendant of Mary Towne Esty who was executed during the Salem Witch Trials.

Esty attended Framingham Academy as a boy. He then trained in architecture with Boston architect Richard Bond. In 1847, he worked for architect G.J.F. Bryant before opening his own Boston office the following year. Many of Esty's churches were variations of a popular nineteenth-century style similar to Richard Upjohn's. In addition to his church designs, Esty designed numerous university, public, and office buildings.  He also proposed a design for the Library of Congress building in Washington, D.C.  From 1876 until his death, he was employed by the United States Treasury as Superintendent of Construction to the first United States Post Office and Sub-Treasury Building in Boston's Post Office Square.

Awards
Esty received an honorary Master of Arts degree in 1866 from the University of Rochester.

Works Listed in the National Register of Historic Places
Prospect Congregational Church (Christ the King Church), 1851, Cambridge, Massachusetts
Paul Gibbs House, 1860, Framingham, Massachusetts
Moses Ellis House, 1866, Framingham, Massachusetts
First Methodist Church of Burlington, 1869, Burlington, Vermont
Old Cambridge Baptist Church, 1869, Cambridge, Massachusetts
St. John's Episcopal Church (Framingham, Massachusetts), 1871, Framingham, Massachusetts
Concord Square Historic District, Framingham, Massachusetts

Other works
State Normal School Building, 1853, Framingham, Massachusetts
Park Street Baptist Church, 1854, Framingham, Massachusetts
Cornerstone Baptist Church, 1854 (remodeled in 1885 by Van Brunt & Howe to whom the National Register of Historic Places incorrectly gives sole credit), Framingham, Massachusetts
Anderson Hall at the University of Rochester, 1861, Rochester, New York
Emmanuel Episcopal Church, Boston, 1861, Boston, Massachusetts
St. Mark's Church, 1863, Southborough, Massachusetts
St. John's Episcopal Church, 1864, Gloucester, Massachusetts
Colby Hall at Andover-Newton Theological Seminary, 1865, Newton, Massachusetts
Church of Our Saviour, Brookline, 1868, Brookline, Massachusetts
Memorial Hall at Colby College, 1869, Waterville, Maine
Newton Free Library, 1870, Newton, Massachusetts
Baptist Church, 1870, North Billerica, Massachusetts
Clinton Town Hall, 1872, Clinton, Massachusetts
Union United Methodist Church, 1872, Boston, Massachusetts
Grace Episcopal Church, 1872, Newton, Massachusetts
Monks Building, 1873, South Boston, Massachusetts
Edgell Grove Cemetery gateway, 1875, Framingham, Massachusetts
St. Luke's Episcopal Church, 1876, East Greenwich, Rhode Island
Boston and Albany Railroad Station, 1881, Boston, Massachusetts
Shurtleff College building, date unknown, Alton, Illinois

References

1826 births
1881 deaths
Architects from Massachusetts
Architects from Boston
People from Framingham, Massachusetts
19th-century American architects